In Greek mythology, Thanatos (pronounced in  "Death", from θνῄσκω thnēskō "(I) die, am dying") was the personification of death. He was a minor figure in Greek mythology, often referred to but rarely appearing in person.

His name is transliterated in Latin as Thanatus, but his counterpart in Roman mythology is Mors or Letum.

In myth and poetry 
The Greek poet Hesiod established in his Theogony that Thánatos has no father, but is the son of Nyx (Night) and brother of Hypnos (Sleep).

Homer confirmed Hypnos and Thanatos as twin brothers in his epic poem, the Iliad, where they were charged by Zeus via Apollo with the swift delivery of the slain hero Sarpedon to his homeland of Lycia.

Counted among Thanatos' siblings were other negative personifications such as Geras (Old Age), Oizys (Suffering), Moros (Doom), Apate (Deception), Momus (Blame), Eris (Strife), Nemesis (Retribution) and the Acherousian/Stygian boatman Charon. Thanatos was loosely associated with the three Moirai (for Hesiod, also daughters of Night), particularly Atropos, who was a goddess of death in her own right. He is also, at times, specified as being exclusive to a peaceful death, while the bloodthirsty Keres embodied violent death. His duties as a Guide of the Dead were sometimes superseded by Hermes Psychopompos. Conversely, Thanatos may have originated as a mere aspect of Hermes before later becoming distinct from him.

The god's character is established by Hesiod in the following passage of the Theogony:

Thanatos was thus regarded as merciless and indiscriminate, hated by – and hateful towards — mortals and gods alike. But in myths which feature him, Thanatos could occasionally be outwitted, a feat that the sly King Sisyphus of Korinth twice accomplished. When it came time for Sisyphus to die, Zeus ordered Thanatos to chain Sisyphus up in Tartarus. Sisyphus cheated death by tricking Thanatos into his own shackles, thereby preventing the demise of any mortal while Thanatos was so enchained.

Eventually Ares, the bloodthirsty god of war, grew frustrated with the battles he incited, since neither side could suffer any casualties. He released Thanatos and handed his captor over to the god. Sisyphus would evade Death a second time by convincing Persephone to allow him to return to his wife stating that she never gave him a proper funeral. This time, Sisyphus was forcefully dragged back to the Underworld by Hermes, where he was sentenced to an eternity of frustration in Tartarus, rolling a boulder up a hill only to have it roll back down when he got close to the top.

A fragment of Alcaeus, a Greek lyric poet of the 6th century BC, refers to this episode:

As the son of Aeolus (and thus a descendant of the Titan Prometheus), Sisyphus was a more-than-mortal figure: when it came to ordinary humans, Thanatos was usually thought of as inexorable. The sole time he was successfully prevented from claiming a mortal life was by the intervention of the hero Heracles, a son of Zeus. Thanatos had come to take the soul of Alkestis, who had offered her life in exchange for the continued life of her husband, King Admetos of Pherai. Heracles was an honored guest in the House of Admetos at the time and offered to repay the king's hospitality by contending with Death itself for Alkestis' life. When Thanatos ascended from Hades to claim Alkestis, Heracles sprung upon the god and overpowered him, winning the right to have Alkestis remain, while Thanatos fled, cheated of his quarry.

Euripides, in Alcestis:

In art

An Orphic Hymn that invoked Thanatos, here given in late 18th century translation:
To Death, Fumigation from Manna.

Hear me, O Death, whose empire unconfin'd
extends to mortal tribes of ev'ry kind.
On thee, the portion of our time depends,
whose absence lengthens life, whose presence ends.

Thy sleep perpetual bursts the vivid folds
by which the soul, attracting body holds:
common to all, of ev'ry sex and age,
for nought escapes thy all-destructive rage.

Not youth itself thy clemency can gain,
vigorous and strong, by thee untimely slain.
In thee the end of nature’s works is known,
in thee all judgment is absolved alone.
No suppliant arts thy dreadful rage controul,
no vows revoke the purpose of thy soul.
O blessed power, regard my ardent prayer,
and human life to age abundant spare.

In later eras, as the transition from life to death in Elysium became a more attractive option, Thanatos came to be seen as a beautiful Ephebe. He became associated more with a gentle passing than a woeful demise. Many Roman sarcophagi depict him as a winged boy, very much akin to Cupid: "Eros with crossed legs and torch reversed became the commonest of all symbols for Death", observes Arthur Bernard Cook.

Thanatos has also been portrayed as a slumbering infant in the arms of his mother Nyx, or as a youth carrying a butterfly (the ancient Greek word "ψυχή" can mean soul or butterfly, or life, amongst other things) or a wreath of poppies (poppies were associated with Hypnos and Thanatos because of their hypnogogic traits and the eventual death engendered by overexposure to them).

He is often shown carrying an inverted torch (holding it upside down in his hands), representing a life extinguished. He is usually described as winged and with a sword sheathed at his belt. In Euripides' Alcestis (438 BCE), he is depicted dressed in black and carrying a sword. Thanatos was rarely portrayed in art without his twin brother Hypnos.

Thanatos is also famously shown on the Euphronios Krator where he and his brother Hypnos are shown carrying the body of Sarpedon to his home for burial.  Here he is pictured as a full-grown and bearded man with wings, as is his brother.

In psychology and medicine 

According to Sigmund Freud, humans have a life instinct—which he named "Eros"—and a death drive, which is commonly called (though not by Freud himself) "Thanatos". This postulated death drive allegedly compels humans to engage in risky and self-destructive acts that could lead to their own death. Behaviors such as thrill seeking and aggression are viewed as actions which stem from this Thanatos instinct.

However, some scientists argue that there is little evidence that most people have a specific drive toward self-destruction. According to them, the behaviors Freud studied can be explained by simpler, known processes, such as salience biases (e.g., a person abuses drugs because the promise of immediate pleasure is more compelling than the intellectual knowledge of harm sometime in the future) and risk calculations (e.g., a person drives recklessly or plays dangerous sports because the increases in status and reproductive success outweigh the risk of injury or death).

Thanatophobia is the fear of things associated with or reminiscent of death and mortality, such as corpses or graveyards. It is related to necrophobia, although the latter term typically refers to a specific fear of dead bodies rather than a fear of death in general.

Thanatology is the academic and scientific study of death among human beings. It investigates the circumstances surrounding a person's death, the grief experienced by the deceased's loved ones, and larger social attitudes towards death such as ritual and memorialization. It is primarily an interdisciplinary study, frequently undertaken by professionals in nursing, psychology, sociology, psychiatry, social work and veterinary science. It also describes bodily changes that accompany death and the after-death period.

Thanatophoric dysplasia, so named because of its lethality at birth, is the most common lethal congenital skeletal dysplasia with an estimated prevalence of one in 6,400 to one in 16,700 births. Its name Thanatophoros, means "death-bearing" in Greek.

Euthanasia, "good death" in Greek, is the act or practice of ending the life of an individual who would otherwise experience severe, incurable suffering or disability. It typically involves lethal injection or the suspension of extraordinary medical treatment. Doctor Jack Kevorkian named his euthanasia device the Thanatron.

See also
 Death drive
 Thanatosensitivity
 Thanatosis
 Thanatology
 Pale Horseman, one of the Four Horsemen of the Apocalypse, also named Thanatos
 Thanatophobia

References

External links 
 THANATOS on The Theoi Project
 Mythography : The Greek God Thanatos in Myth and Art
 Stewart, Michael. "Thanatos" Greek Mythology: From the Iliad to the Fall of the Last Tyrant
 Thanatos on IMDb

Chthonic beings
Greek death gods
Personifications in Greek mythology
Mythology of Heracles
Psychopomps
 
Children of Nyx
Greek underworld
Deities in the Iliad
Divine twins
Personifications of death
Personifications
Avian humanoids
Deeds of Ares